Howrah–Rajgir Fast Passenger is a passenger train belonging to Eastern Railway zone that runs between  and . It is currently being operated with 53043/53044 train numbers on a daily basis.

Average speed and frequency 

The 53043/Howrah–Rajgir Fast Passenger runs with an average speed of 28 km/h and completes 656 km in 23h 45m. The 53044/Rajgir–Howrah Fast Passenger runs with an average speed of 28 km/h and completes 656 km in 23h 45m.

Route and halts 

The important halts of the train are:

Coach composite 

The train has standard ICF rakes with max speed of 110 kmph. The train consists of 11 coaches:

 9 General Unreserved
 2 Seating cum Luggage Rake

Traction

Both trains are hauled by a Howrah Loco Shed-based WDM-3A diesel locomotive from Howrah to Rajgir and vice versa.

Rake sharing 

The train shares its rake with 53041/53042 Howrah–Jaynagar Passenger.

Direction reversal

Train reverses its direction 1 times:

Timing 

53044 – Starts daily from Rajgir at 12:40 PM IST and reaches Howrah Junction on 2nd day at 12:10 PM IST

53043 – Starts daily from Howrah at 11:10 AM and reaches Rajgir on dy 2 at 10:55 AM

See also 

 Rajgir railway station
 Howrah Junction railway station
 Howrah–Jaynagar Passenger

Notes

References

External links 

 53043/Howrah–Rajgir Fast Passenger
 53044/Rajgir–Howrah Fast Passenger

Rail transport in Howrah
Transport in Rajgir
Rail transport in West Bengal
Rail transport in Jharkhand
Rail transport in Bihar
Slow and fast passenger trains in India